Daniel Bucatinsky (born September 22, 1965) is an American actor, writer and producer, best known for his role as James Novak in the Shonda Rhimes drama series Scandal, for which he won the Primetime Emmy Award for Outstanding Guest Actor in a Drama Series in 2013. In 2014, Bucatinsky starred on NBC's Marry Me, as well as the revived HBO series The Comeback, which he also executive produced.

Early life and education
Bucatinsky was born in New York City, to Argentine Jewish parents, Julio and Myriam. Their families moved from Russia and Poland to Argentina. He is a graduate of Vassar College in Poughkeepsie, New York.

Career
Bucatinsky was the writer, producer and star of the 2001 romantic comedy All Over the Guy. He has appeared in episodes of many television series, including Curb Your Enthusiasm, Weeds, Friends, NYPD Blue, That '80s Show, Frasier, and Will & Grace, as well as an episode of Grey's Anatomy (where Bucatinsky also serves as a consulting producer). He executive produced and acted in the 2005 HBO series The Comeback along with his producing partner, actress Lisa Kudrow. In 2008, Bucatinsky and Lisa Kudrow again worked as producers for the innovative and largely improvisational web series, Web Therapy, in which Kudrow starred and Bucatinsky also acted; Don Roos, his husband, directed.

Bucatinsky had a recurring role as a journalist and husband of the President's Chief of Staff on the ABC drama series, Scandal, for which he won the 2013 Primetime Emmy Award for Outstanding Guest Actor in a Drama Series.

From 2014 to 2015, Bucatinsky co-starred on the short-lived NBC sitcom Marry Me, where he and Tim Meadows play "The Kevins", the gay dads of Annie (played by Casey Wilson) who are both named Kevin. He started out as a recurring guest star, but was promoted to series regular midway through the series.

He also wrote the book Does This Baby Make Me Look Straight?: Confessions of a Gay Dad.

Personal life
Bucatinsky met his future husband, screenwriter Don Roos, in 1992 when Roos invited him to be his date at the premiere of Love Field. They married in 2008, during the four months same-sex marriage in California was first recognized. The couple have two children, daughter Eliza and son Jonah.

Filmography

References

External links
 

1965 births
20th-century American male actors
21st-century American male actors
Male actors from New York City
American male film actors
Film producers from New York (state)
American people of Argentine-Jewish descent
American people of Polish-Jewish descent
American people of Russian-Jewish descent
American male screenwriters
American gay actors
Jewish American male actors
Jewish American writers
LGBT Jews
American LGBT screenwriters
Living people
Vassar College alumni
Primetime Emmy Award winners
American male television actors
LGBT people from New York (state)
LGBT television producers
Showrunners
Screenwriters from New York (state)
American male television writers
LGBT Hispanic and Latino American people
Hispanic and Latino American male actors
21st-century American Jews
21st-century American LGBT people